The Silver Cliff is a 2011 Brazilian drama film directed by Karim Aïnouz. Alessandra Negrini won the Best Actress prize on the Havana Film Festival for her role.

Plot
Violeta (Alessandra Negrini) is a dentist married and with one son, having a normal working day. While listening to a message left on the phone she panics. The message was written by her husband, Djalma (Otto Jr.), who said he was leaving her and going to Porto Alegre. He asks Violeta to not go after him, but she does not follow the advice and tries to travel as soon as possible, to the capital of Rio Grande do Sul.

Cast
 Alessandra Negrini as Violeta
 Camilla Amado as Norma
 Thiago Martins as Nassir
 Otto Jr. as Djalma
 Carla Ribas as Elvira
 Gabi Pereira as Bel

References

External links
 

2011 films
2011 drama films
Brazilian drama films
2010s Portuguese-language films
Films directed by Karim Aïnouz